Wendy Alexander (born 27 June 1963) is a retired Scottish politician and the former Member of the Scottish Parliament (MSP) for Paisley North. She held various Scottish Government cabinet posts and was the Leader of the Labour Party in Scotland from 2007 to 2008. In 2010–2011 she convened the Scotland Bill Committee on financial powers of the Scottish Parliament.

After leaving politics, she was appointed Associate Dean of Global Business and Associate Dean for Degree Programmes and Career Services at the London Business School, and in April 2015 was appointed as Vice-Principal (International) by the University of Dundee. In March 2016 she was elected a Fellow of the Royal Society of Edinburgh for her work for the university sector. In 30 November 2017, she was appointed as the Scottish Government Trade and Investment Envoy for Higher Education.

Early life and education

Alexander was born on 27 June 1963 in Glasgow to Dr Joyce O. Alexander and Reverend Douglas N. Alexander. Alexander attended Park Mains High School in Erskine and won a scholarship to Lester B. Pearson United World College of the Pacific in British Columbia before studying at the University of Glasgow, where she graduated with a First Class MA (Hons) in Economic and Modern History. She later gained a postgraduate MA in Industrial Relations from the University of Warwick, and an MBA from INSEAD. She was awarded an honorary degree from Strathclyde University in 2007.

Early career
After her MBA Alexander worked for Booz & Co., an international management consultancy, undertaking assignments in Europe, Asia, North America and Australasia.

Adviser to Donald Dewar
Following Labour's landslide victory at the 1997 general election, Alexander was appointed Special Adviser to Donald Dewar when he became Secretary of State for Scotland. She was deeply involved in the preparation of the White Paper on devolution, the Scotland Act 1998 and preparations for the establishment of the Scottish Parliament, all matters she had published on during the 1990s.

Member of Scottish Parliament
Wendy Alexander served as a Member of the Scottish Parliament (MSP) from its creation in 1999 until 2011.

Ministerial career

From 1999 to 2002 Wendy Alexander was a Scottish Government minister, first serving as Minister for Communities, then as Minister for Enterprise and Lifelong Learning, and subsequently as Minister for Enterprise, Transport and Lifelong Learning.

As Communities Minister she launched the free central heating installation programme for all pensioners without a system. She oversaw the creation of the first social justice report, "A Scotland where everyone matters – our vision for Social Justice", setting ambitious new targets for delivering social justice and defeating child poverty in Scotland, and an Annual Scottish Social Justice Report to measure progress towards those targets.

She set up the Homelessness Task Force, which led to radical homelessness legislation and she championed the community ownership of housing by tenants including the removal of £1.6bn of Glasgow debt. The tenants subsequently voted in a referendum 2:1 in favour of transfer – the largest of its kind in the UK, involving 89,000 homes.

As Communities Minister, Alexander fought hard to bring about the repeal of Section 28 to contribute to social acceptance and greater equality for the LGBT community by removing a ban on the promotion of homosexuality by local authorities. in the face of a sustained campaign by Stagecoach millionaire and later SNP donor Brian Souter to keep the legislation. In the end the repeal, contained in the  ethical Standards in Public Life (Scotland) Bill was passed by 99 votes to 17. During the final debate, Alexander said, "Repeal is not, and never has been, about the promotion of homosexuality in our schools. It is not about political correctness or, even less, about marriage. It is about building a tolerant Scotland. We know that teachers are confused about the meaning of section 2A, we know that bullying exists in our schools and elsewhere, and we know that children's organisations overwhelmingly back repeal."

Alexander oversaw the Scottish Executive's response to the recommendations of the McIntosh Commission into the future of local government in Scotland, introducing a package of measures for local government including giving local authorities the lead role in developing Community Planning, creating a formal Power of Community Initiative (later known as a power of well-being) and establishing the Renewing Local Democracy (Kerley) Working Party on electoral systems. Building on the work of the Best Value Taskforce, she also announced plans for a statutory duty to secure Best Value in local government services.

She also published the first Equality Statement to Parliament, established the Executive's Equalities Unit, announced the first Scottish-wide fund to tackle violence against women – the Domestic Abuse Service Development Fund – and the first national loan fund, administered by a new organisation – Social Investment Scotland – to invest in emerging social enterprises and "make it easier for the voluntary sector to emerge as an effective third force, alongside the traditional public and private sectors".

As Enterprise Minister Alexander launched Smart, Successful Scotland, a widely welcomed new economic strategy for Scotland supporting high-skill, high-value investment such as that by Rolls-Royce. She launched Scotland's first ever Science strategy and developed a better pipeline to get ideas out of labs and into businesses, including the Proof of Concept Fund and the Scottish Co-Investment Fund to stimulate private venture capital investment in emerging businesses. She also championed the first broadband strategy for Scotland and took action to tackle the 'digital divide'.

Alexander promoted a "learning, earning" nation including the doubling of the number of Modern Apprenticeships, jointly leading the Clyde Shipyards Taskforce to help modernise shipbuilding on the Clyde through investment in skills, and in the face of the global downturn in electronics hitting companies such as Motorola launched what became the PACE (Partnership for Continuing Employment) initiative to help those made redundant find work quickly. 
As Minister with responsibility for skills and lifelong learning she promoted higher education enterprise links and championed research, modernising management and widening access to universities by those previously excluded. She also extended Educational Maintenance Allowances to support pupils from low income families to complete their schooling.

Alexander launched a new international economic strategy for Scotland called Global Connections realigning Scotland's international economic effort with the Smart Successful Scotland strategy, bringing together Scotland's previously separate inward investment and export agencies into one organisation, Scotland Development International and created the Globalscot network to develop and expand Scotland's standing in the global business community.

Alexander resigned from ministerial office on 4 May 2002. After her resignation from Jack McConnell's Cabinet she became a visiting professor at the Strathclyde Business School and became a member, and subsequently Chair of the Scottish Parliament's Finance Committee. She inspired and led the Allander Series of seminars which had the aim of encouraging fresh thinking on Scotland's economic future. The seminars brought William Baumol, Ed Glaeser and Nobel laureates James Heckman and Paul Krugman from across the spectrum of political economy to Scotland to reflect on issues such as the returns to early intervention, supporting innovation and cities as future growth engines.

She also authored Chasing the Tartan Tiger: Lessons from a Celtic Cousin? (2003), co-edited (with Diane Coyle and Brian Ashcroft) New Wealth for Old Nations: Scotland’s Economic Prospects (2005), edited an anthology of essays on the life of the late First Minister, Donald Dewar: Scotland's first First Minister (2005) and wrote a non-political column for young mums in the Daily Record.

Leader of the Labour Party in Scotland

Election
Following the Scottish Parliament elections in May 2007, Alexander became Shadow Cabinet Secretary for Finance and Sustainable Growth. Following Jack McConnell's resignation in August 2007, she announced her candidacy for Leader of the Labour Party in Scotland. Alexander laid out her vision to "Renew the party organisation, reform the policies, and reconnect the Labour Party in Scotland with its electorate". Other contenders ruled themselves out and she was elected unopposed by Labour MSPs on 14 September 2007.

As the leader of the Labour Party in Scotland, Alexander believed that "the people of Scotland told us loud and clear they wanted change. They didn't whisper – they shouted it. So change we must!" She argued that Labour must offer radical change to regain the trust of voters, a vision spelt out in Scottish Labour New Directions: Change is what we do, a publication outlining her views on the future policy direction for the Labour Party in Scotland. Addressing Labour's Scottish Conference as Leader she spoke of the need for Labour to be the progressive party of Scotland. Alexander argued: "'Scotland' is not a political philosophy. 'Scotland' can just as easily be Adam Smith as it can be John Smith. The world over, politics comes down to a choice: right versus left, conservatives versus progressives, nationalists versus internationalists".

Organisationally, she called for a new approach to candidate selection, including primary systems to give all Labour supporters a chance to be involved in choosing their local member. Policy initiatives included establishing a Literacy Commission with Rhona Brankin to investigate child literacy standards in Scottish schools (subsequently embraced by all parties in the Parliament), supporting investment in the early years, including nursery places for all vulnerable 2-year-olds, more one-on-one tuition in schools, personalised care plans for those with chronic conditions and legislation providing for a modern apprenticeship for every qualified school leaver who sought one.

Calman Commission

Alexander made a speech at the University of Edinburgh on St Andrew's Day 2007 in which she set out the case for a wide-ranging review of the devolution settlement, with a view to identifying possible areas for reform. The speech laid out her proposals for "a more balanced home rule package" including greater financial accountability and new tax powers for the Scottish Parliament (a cause that she had first championed when she led the Allander Series) in order that the "Union become a more comfortable home for all its members". She said "Scotland wants to see a future that allows her to walk taller within the UK without walking out" and called for a new "expert-led and independent" Scottish constitutional commission.

As the leader of the Labour Party in Scotland, she set this in motion by working with the Conservative and Liberal Democrat leaders to set up the Commission on Scottish Devolution (aka the Calman Commission) in a "bold cross-party, cross-border initiative". The review was established by a vote of the Scottish Parliament. The Calman Commission became a unique Scottish Parliament-UK Government joint venture which reported back to the Parliament in June 2009 proposing wide-ranging changes in the financing of the Scottish Parliament. Alexander wrote then "history teaches that constitutional reform has never been gifted to Scotland. It has to be fought and argued for... Calman will shape the next phase of Scotland's journey…[with] a range of common sense measures to improve relationships".

On St. Andrew's Day 2010, three years to the day after Alexander's call for a Commission, the UK Government introduced a new Scotland Bill. The proposals in the bill closely followed the commission's recommendations and proposed major new financial powers worth £12 billion, giving Holyrood control of a third of its budget. Under the legislation, Holyrood will set a Scottish income tax rate each year from 2015, applying equally to the basic, high and additional rates. The UK Government called it the "biggest transfer of fiscal powers to Scotland since the creation of the Union." In December 2010 Alexander was appointed convener of the Scottish Parliament's Committee to report on the bill.

Scottish independence referendum

During a TV interview on 4 May 2008, Wendy Alexander suggested that she would be willing to support a referendum on Scottish Independence saying "Bring it on!". It was a bold move, but led to suggestions of a rift between her and the Prime Minister, who did not overtly back her. On 7 May, at Prime Minister's Questions, Prime Minister, Gordon Brown stated that she was not, in fact, offering Labour's support for an immediate referendum.

During First Minister's Questions in the Scottish Parliament, on 8 May, Alexander asked Alex Salmond to bring forward a referendum bill at the first opportunity. Alex Salmond declined the offer of Labour support for a referendum, preferring to delay by at least a further year, saying "We will stick to what was laid out in pages 8 and 15 of the SNP manifesto".

Resignation over foreign donation

In 2007, a controversy developed after it emerged that Alexander's campaign team had accepted a £950 impermissible donation from Paul Green, a property magnate, a matter that was investigated by the Electoral Commission and Strathclyde Police. When it emerged that the donation of £950 had come from a personal account, and not a business account, the money was immediately forfeited. Further newspaper reports on 30 November indicated Alexander was aware of the identity of the donor, after having sent a personal letter of gratitude to Mr Green (at his home in Jersey) concerning the donation. As Mr Green was not registered as an elector in the United Kingdom this barred him from donating to a UK-based party. However, the Electoral Commission concluded in February 2008 that Alexander had taken 'significant steps' to comply with funding regulations and decided there was no basis for further action. As part of the Electoral Commission ruling, they also stated that Alexander "did not take all reasonable steps" and that "there is not sufficient evidence to establish that an offence has been committed".
These mixed messages have resulted in a number of people questioning the decision, including Alex Salmond the head of the Scottish Government who likened the result to a not proven verdict.

In a separate development, a few days earlier in February 2008, the Scottish Parliament standards watchdog reported Alexander to the procurator fiscal for failing to declare as gifts the donations that were made to the fund for her campaign for the leadership of the Labour Party in Scotland. Alexander had been told by the parliamentary authorities that there was no need to declare these donations as gifts. In previous leadership campaigns, campaign donations were not treated as gifts. Again the subsequent investigation led to a decision by the Crown Office to take no further action.

Despite this ruling, on 26 June 2008, on the eve of the Parliamentary summer recess, the SNP-led Standards Committee of the Parliament voted 4 to 3 to propose a one-day ban from the Scottish Parliament as a sanction for not declaring leadership campaign donations as gifts on the Parliament's register of interests. The proposed ban was overwhelmingly rejected by the Parliament in a subsequent vote in September 2008. However, with Holyrood going into summer recess at the time, Alexander would have had to wait until September for all MSPs to vote on the recommendation. So, rather than having the issue hanging over her – and her party – Alexander announced her resignation as leader on 28 June 2008. She subsequently stated it had been a mistake for her to take on the leadership of the Labour Party in Scotland while her children were so young.

Parliamentary career
From 2008 to 2011 Alexander served as a member of the Scottish Parliament's Economy, Energy and Tourism Committee. She was also convenor of the Scotland Bill Committee, which produced the report for the Scottish Parliament and UK Government in March 2011 proposing new powers for the Scottish Parliament. Many of these proposals recommend greater fiscal autonomy for Scotland, including improved borrowing powers, the ability to issue bonds and further tax devolution. Despite the Scottish Government's initial opposition to the bill they supported the Scotland Bill Committee's recommendations, with parliament voting 121:3 in favour. In her valedictory speech on the Scotland Bill, Alexander said: "This initiative has from beginning to end been cross-party, consensual and co-operative among the participating parties. [...] The bill will deliver the most far-reaching transfer of financial powers from London since the creation of the union. [...] In the future, all Scottish political parties will have to make decisions about raising money as well as about spending it. [...] The bill serves Scotland better [...] It is, quite simply, in the national interest."

She stood down from Parliament in May 2011 to seek a new life outside active politics.

Alexander also serves as a member of the Social Market Foundation's Advisory Board and Reform Scotland's Political Advisory Board.

Personal life and family
Wendy Alexander is married to Elizabeth Ashcroft, an economist who came out as a transgender woman in September 2020. They have fraternal twin children.

Alexander's brother is the former Labour politician Douglas.

See also
 List of Scottish Executive Ministerial Teams
 Scotland Bill 2010-11

References

External links

Wendy Alexander MSP

|-

|-

|-

|-

1963 births
Living people
Labour MSPs
Leaders of Scottish Labour
Scottish columnists
Scottish special advisers
Labour Party (UK) officials
British consultants
Politicians from Glasgow
Academics of the University of Strathclyde
People educated at a United World College
Alumni of the University of Glasgow
Alumni of the University of Warwick
INSEAD alumni
Members of the Scottish Parliament 1999–2003
Members of the Scottish Parliament 2003–2007
Members of the Scottish Parliament 2007–2011
People educated at Park Mains High School
People associated with the University of Dundee
Ministers of the Scottish Government
Women members of the Scottish Government
20th-century Scottish women politicians
Scottish women columnists
People from Bishopton